SAS Institute (or SAS, pronounced "sass") is an American multinational developer of analytics software based in Cary, North Carolina. SAS develops and markets a suite of analytics software (also called SAS), which helps access, manage, analyze and report on data to aid in decision-making. The company is the world's largest privately held software business and its software is used by most of the Fortune 500.

SAS Institute started as a project at North Carolina State University to create a statistical analysis system (hence the proper name, Statistical Analysis System) that was originally used primarily by agricultural departments at universities in the late 1960s. It became an independent, private business led by current CEO James Goodnight and three other project leaders from the university in 1976. SAS grew from $10 million in revenues in 1980 to $1.1 billion by 2000. In 1998 a larger proportion of these revenues were spent on research and development than at most other software companies; in 1997 these were more than double the industry average.

History
The Statistical Analysis System (SAS) began as a project at North Carolina State University's agricultural department. It was originally led by Anthony James Barr in 1966, then joined by NCSU graduate student James Goodnight in 1967 and John Sall in 1973. In the early 1970s, the software was primarily leased to other agricultural departments in order to analyze the effect soil, weather and seed varieties had on crop yields. The project was funded by the National Institutes of Health and later by  a coalition of university statistics programs called the University Statisticians of the Southern Experiment Stations.

By 1976 the software had 100 customers and 300 people attended the first SAS user conference in Kissimmee, Florida, that year. Goodnight, Barr, Sall and another early participant, Jane Helwig, founded SAS Institute Inc. as a private company on July 1, 1976, in offices across the street from the university. Barr and Helwig later sold their interest in the company.

SAS' tradition of polling users for suggestions to improve the software through the SASWare Ballot was adopted during its first year of operation. Many of the company's employee perks, such as fresh fruit, reasonable work hours and free M&M's every Wednesday became part of the company's practices that first year. In the late 1970s, the company established its first marketing department.

SAS started building its current headquarters in a forested area of Cary, North Carolina in 1980. Later that year it started providing on-site daycare in order to keep an employee who was planning on being a stay-at-home mom. By 1984, SAS had begun building a fitness center, medical center, on-site cafe and other facilities. It had also developed some of its other benefits programs. SAS became known as a good place to work and was frequently recognized by national magazines like BusinessWeek, Working Mother and Fortune for its work environment.

During the 1980s, SAS was one of Inc. Magazine's fastest growing companies in America from 1979 and 1985. It grew more than ten percent per year from $10 million in revenues in 1980 to $1.1 billion by 2000. In 2007, SAS revenue was $2.15 billion, and in 2013 its revenue was $3.02 billion. By the late 1990s, SAS was the largest privately held software company. The Associated Press reported that analysts attributed the growth to aggressive R&D spending. It had the highest ratio of its revenues spent on R&D in the industry for eight years, setting a record of 34 percent of its revenues in 1993, as it was working on a new menu-based interface. The company began its relationship with Microsoft and development for Windows operating systems in 1989. Shortly afterwards it established partnerships with database companies like Oracle, Sybase and Informix.

An education division was created in 1997 to create software for schools, including the newly formed Cary Academy. In 2003 the Bank of America Foundation purchased and donated licenses for the software to 400 schools in North Carolina. SAS funded its first advertising program in 2000 with a $30 million television and radio campaign.

The company considered making 25 percent of the company available on the stock market and providing employees with stock-options during the dot-com bubble before the following downturn, but ultimately chose not to. SAS was one of the few technology companies that did well during the downturn and hired aggressively to take advantage of available staff.

In 2009, SAS filed a lawsuit against World Programming Ltd., alleging World Programming System—a software product designed to use the features of the SAS language—violated their copyright as it was reverse engineered from the functionality of SAS Learning Edition. The European Court of Justice ruled that functionality and language elements were not protected and the case was discussed in Oracle v. Google

SAS introduced its first reseller program intended to grow sales with small to medium-sized businesses in 2006. Leading up to 2007, SAS provided funding and curriculum assistance to help start the Master of Science in Analytics program at nearby North Carolina State University. The company's cloud-based products grew in revenues by 35 percent in 2014 and the construction of Building Q was completed late that year to house its corresponding operations.

In March 2014, SAS launched its SAS Analytics U initiative to provide free foundational technologies and support to teachers and students.

In July 2021, the Wall Street Journal reported that the semiconductor giant Broadcom was in talks to acquire SAS. In a July 13, 2021 email, SAS CEO Jim Goodnight stated that the company was not for sale.

Operations
SAS Institute has grown in revenue each year since it was incorporated in 1976. About 20-30% of the company's revenues are spent on research and development, which is the highest ratio among software companies of its size. In 1994, Computerworld found that out of the world's 50 largest software companies, SAS spent 2.5 times the industry average on R&D. As of 2010 revenues come relatively evenly from Europe, Africa, the Middle East and the Americas. According to the company's 2014 financial reporting, its revenues are currently 46.7 percent from the Americas, 41.4 from Europe, Middle East and Africa, and 11.9 percent from Asia-Pacific. SAS has about 5,200 employees at its headquarters in Cary, North Carolina, 1,600 employees elsewhere in the US and 6,900 in Europe, Asia, Canada or Latin America. CEO James Goodnight owns about two-thirds of the company and co-founder John Sall owns the other one-third.

Workplace
SAS is well known for its workplace culture. The company was used as a model for workplace perks at Google and is taught as a case study in management seminars at Stanford. SAS has been identified as a "Best Company to Work For" in Fortune's annual rankings each year since the list's inception in 1997. In 2014, SAS ranked No. 2 on the elite Top 25 World's Best Multinational Workplaces list from Great Place to Work as well as No. 2 among Fortune's 2014 Best Companies to Work For in the US. SAS was No. 1 on the US list in 2010 and 2011. On March 5, 2015, Fortune ranked SAS No. 4 on its annual list of best companies to work for in the US. On March 5, 2016, Fortune ranked SAS No. 8, down from number 4 in 2015 on its annual list of best companies to work for in the US. It is also regularly in Working Mother Magazine's "100 Best Companies for Working Mothers" list.

Benefits

SAS offers on-site day care services to its employees for 850 children for about a third of the normal cost. Medical services are provided to employees and their families for free and 80% of the cost is covered for specialists. Employees are encouraged to work 35-hour weeks and have free access to a recreation and fitness center as well as life counseling services. It also hosts a summer camp for children and operates on-site cafeterias and cafes. 22.5 tons of M&Ms are provided each year, in jars that are re-filled every Wednesday. Similar amenities are provided at its other offices besides its headquarters.

SAS spokespeople say its employee benefits are provided for business, not altruistic, reasons. The company evaluates new benefits using three criteria: whether it would benefit the company culture, whether it would serve a significant number of employees and whether it would save more money than is spent on it. According to academics, the company's practices improve the loyalty, focus and creativity of its staff. Professor Jeffrey Pfeffer from the Stanford Graduate School of Business estimated that the company saves $60–$80 million annually in expenses related to employee turnover. SAS has an annual employee turnover of three to five percent, while the software industry's average is 20 to 25 percent. According to USA Today, the workplace culture has created "intensely loyal" staff who care about the company's well-being.  Even though there are unlimited sick days, the average employee takes only two. The 40,000 free medical visits provided to employees annually are estimated to cost the company US$4.5 million, but save it US$5 million due to the employee productivity lost when staff spend their work-hours in waiting rooms at other hospitals.

Structure and culture
SAS has a limited corporate hierarchy and an egalitarian culture.  As the company grew it created new divisions, instead of layers of management, creating a flat, simple organizational structure. According to professor Jeffrey Pfeffer from Stanford, there are only three levels in the organization and CEO Jim Goodnight has 27 people who directly report to him. The organizational structure is fluid and employees can change roles rapidly.

Managers are involved in the day-to-day work with their employees. Employees are given a large extent of autonomy and developers are encouraged to pursue experimental product ideas. Input from customers guides the company's marketing and software development. According to SAS, 80 percent of suggestions for product improvements are incorporated into the software. The dress code is informal. According to Fast Company, employees describe the environment as "relaxed."

Employees are encouraged to do volunteer work and the company makes donation to non-profits where employees are involved. The company primarily focuses its philanthropic efforts on improving education. It funds pilot programs for new education models, donates laptops and provides free online software for classrooms called Curriculum Pathways.

Acquisitions

Software

As of 2012, SAS is the largest privately owned software company in the world. It develops, supports and markets a suite of analytics software also called SAS (statistical analysis system), which captures, stores, modifies, analyzes and presents data. The SAS system and SAS programming language are used by most of the Fortune 500. The SAS software includes a Base SAS component that performs analytical functions and more than 200 other modules that add graphics, spreadsheets or other features. SAS Institute also sells the JMP suite of statistical analysis software, which consists of JMP, JMP Pro, JMP Clinical and JMP Genomics.

Some of the uses for SAS' software include analyzing financial transactions for indications of fraud, optimizing prices for retailers, or evaluating the results of clinical trials. As of 2012, SAS is the largest market-share holder in the advanced analytics segment with a 36.2 percent share and the fifth largest for business intelligence software with a 6.9 percent share. SAS typically sells its software with an emphasis on subscription models that include support and updates, as opposed to software licenses.

User community
The SAS certification program was established in 1999. and SAS Publishing was created in 2000 as a separate entity that works to increase the availability of SAS-related books. SAS Publishing hosts an online bookstore, develops product documentation and publishes SAS-related books authored by users. There are more than 200 SAS users groups devoted to a specialty, an individual client, or a geography. There are local, regional, national and international users groups

See also

 Revolution Analytics

References

External links

 

Companies based in Cary, North Carolina
Software companies established in 1976
Data analysis software
Data companies
Financial technology companies
Information technology consulting firms of India
International information technology consulting firms
Privately held companies based in North Carolina
Privately held companies of the United States
Software companies based in Mumbai
Software companies based in North Carolina
1976 establishments in North Carolina
Software companies of the United States